Emertonia is a genus of copepods in the family Paramesochridae.

Species

References

Harpacticoida
Copepod genera
Crustaceans described in 1932